Harolds Cross is a locality in the Queanbeyan–Palerang Regional Council, New South Wales, Australia. It is located about 11 km northeast of Captains Flat and 35 km southwest of Braidwood. It had a "half-time" school from 1868 and 1915; from 1949 to 1957, it operated as a "provisional school".

References

Localities in New South Wales
Queanbeyan–Palerang Regional Council
Southern Tablelands